Chalchihuitán is a town and one of the 119 Municipalities of Chiapas, in southern Mexico. It covers an area of 74.5 km².

In 2010, the municipality had a total population of 14,027, up from 12,256 in 2005.

In 2010, the town of Chalchihuitán had a population of 1,054. Other than the town of Chalchihuitán, the municipality had 45 localities, the largest of which (with 2010 populations in parentheses) were: Chiquinshulum (1,612), classified as urban, and Joltealal (1,004), classified as rural.

References

Municipalities of Chiapas